Inspired by True Events is the third studio album by American singer Tori Kelly. It was released on August 9, 2019, through Schoolboy and Capitol Records. The album is a coming-of-age record, interspersed with deeply personal moments and encapsulates her experiences with marriage, divorce and public scrutinity. The album is primarily influenced by R&B-soul and contains blues, pop, and contemporary-gospel influences.

Background

After releasing her debut album in 2015, Unbreakable Smile, Kelly released Hiding Place, a gospel album co-written & produced with Kirk Franklin.

In 2018, Kelly married basketball player André Murillo, as well as experienced her parents' divorce & the death of her grandfather. These events served for much of the inspiration behind the album.

Kelly worked with Jimmy Napes on much of the album, as well as with Bruno Major, Justin Tranter, and Tayla Parx, among others.

Release 

On June 27, 2019, Kelly announced her third studio album would be released on August 9, 2019. On November 6, 2019, she announced on Instagram that the two deluxe tracks would be released for streaming that Friday.

Singles 
On January 18, 2019, Kelly announced she would be releasing her first single titled "Change Your Mind" on January 25, 2019.

Her second single, "Sorry Would Go A Long Way", was released on June 28, 2019.

On July 19, 2019, the third single, "Language", was released digitally.

A week before her album was released, Kelly released a promotional single titled "2 Places" and debuted it exclusively on Apple Music's Beats 1.

Promotion 
Kelly released the lead single for the album on January 25, 2019 titled "Change Your Mind".

She then went on a two-month promotional tour called The Acoustic Sessions where she performed some unreleased songs along with her top hits.

On June 28, Kelly released "Sorry Would Go A Long Way" which was the second single. The third and final single for the album, "Language", was released on July 19.

On August 9, Kelly performed "Change Your Mind", "Language", & "Sorry Would Go A Long Way" on Today. She also performed "Sorry Would Go A Long Way" on The Late Show with Stephen Colbert on August 15, 2019.

She will be on the Inspired by True Events tour in 2020.

Track listing

Charts

Release history

References 

2019 albums
Albums produced by Mike Elizondo
Capitol Records albums
Tori Kelly albums